Harriet Jane Trelawny (1821-1879) was an English author and member of the British landed gentry. She published the novel Sister in 1879.

Life 
Trelawny was born Harriet Jane Tremayne in London in 1821. Her father was John Hearle Tremayne of Cornwall and she was the oldest of her siblings. In 1824, Trelawny married Sir John Salsbury Trelawny, with whom she had one daughter.

Trelawny wrote one novel, which was published shortly before her death in 1879. The work was titled Sister and was published in two volumes by Smith, Elder & Co.

References 

1821 births
1879 deaths
19th-century English women writers
Victorian novelists